John Felix Raj is the Founder Vice-Chancellor and a professor of economics at St. Xavier's University, Kolkata (SXUK), India. He is a Jesuit priest of the Calcutta province of the Society of Jesus. He was the Rector from 1996 to 2002 and Principal from 2009 to 2017 of St. Xavier's College, Kolkata.

Early life 
Raj was born on 26 August 1954 in Poolangudi, Ramanathapuram district, Tamil Nadu. He completed his school education at St. Michael's School, Sengudi and at St. Mary's High School, Thoothukudi.

Education 
He joined the Jesuit Order in 1974 at the age of 20. He graduated from Loyola College, Chennai in 1980 in Economics and acquired a master's degree from St Joseph's College, Tiruchirappalli. He underwent his Jesuit training of philosophy in Pune at JDV and theology at Delhi Vidyajothi Institute respectively. He was ordained priest on 23 April 1989. He completed his Ph.D. in economics in Rabindra Bharati University, Kolkata.

Career 
Raj was the Director and Secretary of the Goethals Indian Library and Research Society in Kolkata from 1996 to 2021.

Raj opened a rural campus at Raghabpur of St. Xavier's College, Kolkata in 2014. Raj took over as the first Vice-Chancellor of St. Xavier's University, Kolkata (SXUK) from 16 February 2017.

Raj was named Banga Bibhushan and Siksha Ratna in 2014 and 2016 respectively by the West Bengal government.

Selected bibliography 
 Raj Felix (2022). Tides – Story Bank, St. Xavier’s University Kolkata Alumni Association, Kolkata. ISBN 978-93-95202-01-5.
 Raj Felix (2020). Waves – Story Bank, St. Xavier’s University Kolkata Alumni Association, Kolkata. .
 Raj John Felix, Roy Samrat, Hati Koushik (2016). Indian Economy: A Visionary Perspective, New Delhi, Regal Publications, .

References 

1954 births
Living people
Rabindra Bharati University alumni
20th-century Indian Jesuits
Indian economists
Indian male writers
Indian philanthropists
21st-century Indian Jesuits